William N. Brownsberger (born March 21, 1957) is an American politician and the President pro tempore of the Massachusetts Senate representing the Second Suffolk and Middlesex District  which includes his hometown of Belmont, as well as Watertown, and parts of Allston, Brighton, Fenway-Kenmore, and Back Bay which are neighborhoods of Boston. From 2007 to 2012, he was a member of the Massachusetts House of Representatives. He was a candidate for the Democratic nomination in the 2013 special election to succeed Ed Markey in the U.S. House of Representatives.

Early life and education
Brownsberger was born in Boston, Massachusetts, and raised in nearby Watertown. He received a Bachelor of Arts from Harvard College in 1978 and then went on to obtain his Juris Doctor from Harvard Law School in 1985.

He served three terms as a Belmont Selectman and as Massachusetts Assistant Attorney General for six years.

Massachusetts House of Representatives
Brownsberger served in the Massachusetts House of Representatives from 2007 to 2012, where he represented the 24th Middlesex district. He was endorsed by the Democratic Socialists of America while seeking reelection in 2010.

Massachusetts Senate 
A member of the Democratic Party, he ran uncontested in a January 2012 special election to replace Steven Tolman in the Massachusetts Senate, having won a crowded Democratic primary. He was sworn in on January 24, 2012. He was then re-elected in November 2012 to a 2-year term to the 188th General Court.

Union opposition 
In 2022, Brownsberger joined Senate President Karen Spilka in opposing unionization effort by Senate staffers, stating "There would be a whole lot of conflict of interest issues if they're working with a union who has its own political agenda. You can't have people serving multiple masters, that’s just not acceptable."

Electoral history 
Brownsberger ran unsuccessfully in the 2013 special election to succeed U.S. Representative Ed Markey, who resigned in June 2013 to take a seat in the U.S. Senate.

Personal life
Brownsberger resides in Belmont, Massachusetts. He is married with three daughters. He is also a marathoner, triathlete, and cyclist.

See also
 2019–2020 Massachusetts legislature
 2021–2022 Massachusetts legislature

References

External links
 Legislative website
 State House website
 Campaign website
 
 Meet the candidates for state Senate: Will Brownsberger, Boston Globe, November 30, 2011

1957 births
21st-century American politicians
Harvard College alumni
Harvard Law School alumni
Living people
Democratic Party Massachusetts state senators
People from Watertown, Massachusetts